The 1995 German Open was a men's tennis tournament played on clay courts that was part of the Championship Series category of the 1995 ATP Tour. It was the 89th edition of the tournament and took place at the Rothenbaum Tennis Center in Hamburg, Germany, from 8 May to 15 May 1995. Andrei Medvedev won the singles title.

Finals

Singles

 Andrei Medvedev defeated  Goran Ivanišević, 6–3, 6–2, 6–1
It was Andrei Medvedev's 1st singles title of the year, and the 9th of his career.

Doubles

 Wayne Ferreira /  Yevgeny Kafelnikov defeated  Byron Black /  Andrei Olhovskiy, 6–1, 7–6

References

External links
   
 ATP tournament profile
 ITF tournament edition details

 
German Open
Hamburg European Open
ATP German Open